Luis Ricardo Mejía Cajar (born 16 March 1991 in Panama City) is a Panamanian professional footballer who plays as a goalkeeper for Unión Española.

Club career
Nicknamed Manotas, Mejia made his professional debut playing with Tauro in 2007.
 
In 2008, he was transferred to Uruguayan side Centro Atlético Fénix, but finally made his team debut on 21 August 2010 on a match against Tacuarembó, being rewarded as the man of the match. His outstanding performances called the interest of various team of Europe.

In January 2011, he was loaned 6 months to Toulouse but was never able to win a place in the first team, so he had to cope with playing in the reserve team.

In his return to Fénix, he gain the ownership in the first team.

International career
Mejía was part of the Panama U-20 squad that participated in the 2007 FIFA U-20 World Cup in Canada. He was the youngest goalkeeper in the world cup and the revelation. He was also part of the Panama U-20 squad that participated in the 2011 CONCACAF U-20 Championship where his outstanding performances led them to qualify to the Youth World Cup in Colombia.

His senior international debut for Panama came on 8 June 2009 against Jamaica, in a Friendly match.

He was part of the Panama U-23 squad that participated in the 2012 CONCACAF Men's Olympic Qualifying Tournament which they could not qualify to the 2012 Summer Olympics.

In 2011, he was called up by Julio Dely Valdés to play the 2011 CONCACAF Gold Cup.

References

External links
 

1991 births
Living people
Sportspeople from Panama City
Association football goalkeepers
Panamanian footballers
Panamanian expatriate footballers
Panama international footballers
Uruguayan Primera División players
Chilean Primera División players
Tauro F.C. players
Toulouse FC players
Centro Atlético Fénix players
Club Nacional de Football players
Unión Española footballers
Expatriate footballers in Chile
Expatriate footballers in France
Expatriate footballers in Uruguay
Panamanian expatriate sportspeople in Chile
Panamanian expatriate sportspeople in France
Panamanian expatriate sportspeople in Uruguay
2011 CONCACAF Gold Cup players
2013 CONCACAF Gold Cup players
2015 CONCACAF Gold Cup players
2019 CONCACAF Gold Cup players
2021 CONCACAF Gold Cup players